Richard Martin Yett (born October 6, 1962) is a former professional baseball pitcher. He played all or part of six seasons in Major League Baseball from 1985 to 1990.

Yett was drafted by the Minnesota Twins in 1980, but Yett only played one game with the team before being traded to the Cleveland Indians in 1985. The next four years he was used often as a long reliever for Cleveland. In late 1989, Yett re-signed with the Twins as a free agent. Yett retired after the 1990 season.

He was born in Pomona, California.

References 

Major League Baseball pitchers
Minnesota Twins players
Cleveland Indians players
Elizabethton Twins players
Wisconsin Rapids Twins players
Visalia Oaks players
Orlando Twins players
Toledo Mud Hens players
Maine Guides players
Buffalo Bisons (minor league) players
Williamsport Bills players
Colorado Springs Sky Sox players
Portland Beavers players
Baseball players from California
Sportspeople from Pomona, California
1962 births
Living people